Diana Ibrahim is a Lebanese actress.

Filmography

Dubbing roles 
 La intrusa - Virginia Martínez Roldán de Junquera / Vanessa Martínez Roldán de Islas
 La mujer de Judas - Chichita Agüero del Toro
 Prophet Joseph - Zuleika

References 
 General
http://www.almadapaper.net/ar/news/499085/ديانا-إبراهيم-لـ-المدى-فاجأني-نجاح-دوبلا
https://web.archive.org/web/20160814162238/http://www.almutmar.com/index.php?id=20097082
https://www.annahar.com/article/95926-ديانا-إبرهيم-تشترط-اللهجة-اللبنانية-في-الدبلجة-مقابل-السورية 
http://www.imdb.com/name/nm8339637/
http://www.elcinema.com/person/1106114

 Specific

External links

Living people
Lebanese stage actresses
Lebanese television actresses
Lebanese University alumni
Lebanese voice actresses
Place of birth missing (living people)
Year of birth missing (living people)
21st-century Lebanese actresses